Type 89 may refer to:
 PF-89, also known as Type 89, a Chinese anti-tank rocket launcher
 Type 89 Tank Destroyer, a Chinese tank destroyer
 Type 89 AFV, a Chinese armoured fighting vehicle
 Type 89 howitzer, a Chinese self-propelled howitzer
 Type 89 Chi-Ro, a Japanese World War II medium tank
 Type 89 Grenade Discharger, a Japanese World War II grenade discharger
 Type 89 machine gun, a Japanese World War II machine gun
 Howa Type 89, an assault rifle
 Mitsubishi Type 89 IFV, a Japanese infantry fighting vehicle